Biotropica is a peer-reviewed scientific journal published by Wiley-Blackwell on behalf of the Association for Tropical Biology & Conservation. The journal publishes articles describing original research on the ecology, conservation and management of tropical ecosystems and on the evolution, behavior, and population biology of tropical organisms. According to the Journal Citation Reports, the journal has a 2018 impact factor of 2.989.

Biotropica publishes articles in four categories:

 Insights: Short and highly original articles
 Papers: Longer research articles
 Reviews: Longer synthesis articles
 Commentaries: Opinion or discussion articles
 Annual Award for Excellence in Tropical Biology and Conservation

A small number of book reviews are also published each year, as are occasional "Special Sections" and "Special Issues" comprising articles on a particular theme.

Origins and History of Biotropica  
The journal was established in 1969 to replace The Bulletin as the Association for Tropical Biology's primary outlet for research articles.  The current editor-in-chief is Jennifer Powers (2020–present). Prior to Powers, the Editors of Biotropica were:

 Emilio M. Bruna (2014–2019)
 Jaboury Ghazoul (2006–2013)
 Robin Chazdon (2004–2005)
 Robert J. Marquis (1997–2003)
 E. Raymond Heithaus (1983–1996)
 Michael Emsley (1973–1982)
 William Stern (1968–1972)

References

External links 
 
 Association for Tropical Biology & Conservation

Ecology journals
English-language journals
Publications established in 1966
Wiley-Blackwell academic journals
Bimonthly journals